Antonio Martínez Menchén (born 1930, in Linares, Jaén) is a Spanish writer. He is best known for his work in children's literature. He began his career under editor Carlos Barral with the publications of Cinco Variaciones (1963) and Las Tapias (1968). He is most widely known for his children's book La espada y la rosa (1993). He is the father of poet Carlos Martínez Aguirre and brother of writer Andrés Sorel.

References 

1930 births
Living people
Spanish writers
People from Linares, Jaén